Aliabad-e Jombozeh (also Romanized as ‘Alīābād-e Jombozeh; also known as ‘Alīābād) is a village in Qombovan Rural District, in the Central District of Dehaqan County, Isfahan Province, Iran. At the 2006 census, its population was 1,305, in 355 families.

References 

Populated places in Dehaqan County